Abdelmajid Oulmers (born 12 September 1978) is a retired Moroccan professional footballer.

Oulmers is the subject of a major legal battle between football clubs and FIFA over the right to compensation for injuries sustained during international duty. He was sidelined from playing for eight months following an injury sustained playing against Burkina Faso in November 2004.

Oulmers played for Morocco at the 2000 Summer Olympics.

References

External links
 
 
 

1978 births
Living people
Moroccan footballers
Morocco international footballers
Olympic footballers of Morocco
Footballers at the 2000 Summer Olympics
RC Lens players
Amiens SC players
R. Charleroi S.C. players
Association football midfielders
Expatriate footballers in Greece
Panthrakikos F.C. players
Wasquehal Football players